is an RPG (Role-playing game) based on the manga series of the same name about a boy and his uneasy friendship with a demon. Released on the Family Computer in 1993 by Yutaka the game has the player in the main role of Ushio in a standard RPG adventure.

This video game is not to be confused with the Super Famicom action game titled Ushio to Tora.

Gameplay
Players unleash their traditional Japanese magic spells in addition to their ally's demonic skills in a game that resembles a Japanese role-playing game. They get to explore Tokyo by moving the character around using a top-down perspective. Houses and dungeons are viewed using a perspective used in traditional interactive fiction stories. The character gets his own statistics screen; which summarizes his offensive skills as well as his defensive skills.

Players can talk to characters and must solve certain quests and/or puzzles before being admitted into certain buildings, houses, or dungeons.

References

External links
Ushio to Tora: Shin'en no Daiyō at MobyGames
Ushio to Tora: Shin'en no Daiyō at GameFAQs

1993 video games
Japan-exclusive video games
Nintendo Entertainment System games
Nintendo Entertainment System-only games
Role-playing video games
Top-down video games
Video games based on anime and manga
Video games developed in Japan
Video games scored by Masaharu Iwata
Video games set in Tokyo
Yutaka games

Tom Create games
Single-player video games